This is a list of valleys of Arizona. Valleys are ordered alphabetically, by county.

Apache County
B
 Bat Canyon
 Beautiful Valley
C
 Chinle Valley, Chinle, Arizona
M
 Monument Valley
R
 Red Rock Valley
W
 Windy Valley (Arizona)

Cochise County
C
 Cienega Valley (Arizona)
S
 San Bernardino Valley
 San Pedro Valley (Arizona), San Pedro River (Arizona)
 San Simon Valley
 Sulphur Springs Valley

Coconino County
A
 Aubrey Valley
C
 Chino Valley (Arizona)
L

Gila County
S
 Salt River Valley

Graham County
A
 Aravaipa Valley, Aravaipa Creek
G
 Gila River Valley
 Gila Valley (Graham County)
W
 Whitlock Valley, Whitlock Mountains

La Paz County

B
 Butler Valley (Arizona)
L
 Lower Colorado River Valley

M
 McMullen Valley
P
 Palo Verde Valley, (also Imperial & Riverside Counties, CA), Palo Verde Mountains, (CA)
 Parker Valley

Maricopa County

A
 Aguila Valley
C
 Childs Valley
 Citrus Valley
D
 Dendora Valley

G
 Gila River Valley
 Growler Valley
H
 Hyder Valley
K
 Kaka Valley

M
 McMullen Valley
P
 Paradise Valley (Arizona), Paradise Valley, Arizona
 Pleasant Valley (Arizona)

R
 Rainbow Valley (Arizona)
S
 Salt River Valley
T
 Tonopah Desert

Mohave County

A
 Antelope Valley (Arizona)
B
 Big Valley (Arizona)
C
 Clayhole Valley
 Cottonwood Valley (Arizona/Nevada)

D
 Detrital Valley
 Dutch Flat (Arizona)
H
 Hualapai Valley
 Lower Colorado River Valley
L
 Lower Hurricane Valley

M
 Main Street Valley
 Mohave Valley, Mohave Mountains, (also a valley of San Bernardino County, CA) 
S
 Sacramento Valley (Arizona), Sacramento Wash
Golden Valley, Arizona

U
 Upper Hurricane Valley
V
 Virgin Valley, Virgin Mountains, Virgin River
W
 Wolf Hole Valley

Navajo County
K
 Kletha Valley
M
 Monument Valley

Pima County

A
 Altar Valley
 Avra Valley, Avra Valley, Arizona
B
 Baboquivari Valley, Baboquivari Mountains

C
 Childs Valley
 Cienega Valley (Arizona)
G
 Green Valley, Arizona
 Growler Valley, Growler Mountains

L
 La Quituni Valley
O
 Oro Valley, Arizona
P
 Pipyak Valley

Q
 Quijotoa Valley
V
 Valley of the Ajo, Ajo, Arizona

Pinal County
F
 Falcon Valley
G
 Gila River Valley

Santa Cruz County
C
 Cienega Valley (Arizona)
G
 Gringo Gulch
S
 San Rafael Valley

Yavapai County

A
 Aguila Valley
C
 Chino Valley (Arizona), (at Paulden, Arizona-(south terminus, Big Chino Wash); Chino Valley, Arizona to south)
 Little Chino Valley

L
 Lonesome Valley
 Little Chino Valley

P
 Prescott Valley, Arizona
 Skull Valley (Arizona), Skull Valley, Arizona

V
 Verde Valley
W
 Williamson Valley

Yuma County

D
 Dome Valley, Dome, Arizona
G
 Gila River Valley
 Gila Valley (Yuma County)

 Growler Valley, Growler Mountains
K
 King Valley

L
 Lower Colorado River Valley
M
 Mohawk Valley (Arizona)

P
 Palo Verde Valley, Palo Verde Mountains
 Park Valley (Arizona)
 San Cristobal Valley

Valleys in the Gila River Valley corridor

 Gila Valley (Graham County)
 Pleasant Valley (Arizona)
 Rainbow Valley (Arizona)
 Citrus Valley
 Dendora Valley
 Hyder Valley
 Park Valley (Arizona)
 San Cristobal Valley
 Mohawk Valley (Arizona)
 Dome Valley
 Gila Valley (Yuma County)

Valleys in the Lower Colorado River Valley corridor, Arizona

 Sacramento Valley (Arizona)
 Mohave Valley
 Parker Valley
 Palo Verde Valley
 Gila Valley (Yuma County)
 Yuma Valley, (also in Baja California(state), Mexico?)

California
 Mohave Valley
 Chemehuevi Valley, Chemehuevi Wash
 Vidal Valley
 Parker Valley
 Palo Verde Valley

Alphabetic listing

A
 Aguila Valley
 Altar Valley
 Antelope Valley (Arizona)
 Aravaipa Valley
 Aubrey Valley
 Avra Valley, Avra Valley, Arizona
B
 Baboquivari Valley, Baboquivari Mountains
 Bat Canyon
 Beautiful Valley
 Big Valley (Arizona)
 Butler Valley (Arizona)
C
 Childs Valley
 Chinle Valley
 Chino Valley (Arizona)
 Little Chino Valley
 Citrus Valley
 Clayhole Valley
D
 Dendora Valley
 Detrital Valley
 Dome Valley
 Dutch Flat (Arizona)
F
 Falcon Valley
G
 Gila River Valley
 Gila Valley (Graham County)
 Gila Valley (Yuma County)
 Golden Valley, Arizona
 Green Valley, Arizona
 Growler Valley, Growler Mountains
H
 Hualapai Valley
 Hyder Valley
K
 Kaka Valley
 King Valley
 Kletha Valley
L
 La Quituni Valley
 Lonesome Valley
 Little Chino Valley
 Lower Colorado River Valley
 Lower Hurricane Valley

M
 Main Street Valley
 McMullen Valley
 Mohave Valley
 Mohawk Valley (Arizona)
 Monument Valley
O
 Oro Valley, Arizona
P
 Palo Verde Valley
 Paradise Valley (Arizona), Paradise Valley, Arizona
 Park Valley (Arizona)
 Parker Valley
 Pipyak Valley
 Pleasant Valley (Arizona)
 Prescott Valley, Arizona
Q
 Quijotoa Valley
R
 Rainbow Valley (Arizona)
 Red Rock Valley
S
 Sacramento Valley (Arizona), Sacramento Wash
 Golden Valley, Arizona
 Salt River Valley
 San Bernardino Valley
 San Cristobal Valley
 San Pedro Valley (Arizona), San Pedro River (Arizona)
 San Rafael Valley
 San Simon Valley
 Skull Valley (Arizona), Skull Valley, Arizona
 Sulphur Springs Valley
T
 Tonopah Desert
U
 Upper Hurricane Valley
V
 Valley of the Ajo, Ajo, Arizona
 Verde Valley
 Virgin Valley, Virgin Mountains, Virgin River
W
 Whitlock Valley
 Williamson Valley
 Windy Valley (Arizona)
 Wolf Hole Valley

See also
List of mountain ranges of Arizona
List of rivers of Arizona

 
Valleys
Arizona